Sidhauli is a village located 4 km from the town of dehri Rohtas, Bihar state, India, and it is located to the north of Dehri, and is governed by a Gangauli Panchayat. The population of the village is 4000, (52% male, 48% female; approximate even split between Hindus and Muslims). Most of Muslim follow Ahle Hadith and Deobandi ideology. The languages spoken in the village are Urdu, Hindi English, and Bhojpuri.

The village has four schools - Sudama High School, Sidhauli Middle School, Sudama Sanskrit Vidyalaya, Sidhauli Urdu Maqtab and Gurukul Academy. The main occupation of the people is trade and small business. Peoples of this village is very friendly in nature and supports each other. It consists of two villages left(West) side of main road is known as Sidhauli while the right(East) side of main road is known as Ahibaranpur, the main road works as dividing boundaries for these villages.

References

External links
 Sidhauli on IndiaStudyChannel.com

Villages in Darbhanga district